Andrew Cameron Schulz (born October 30, 1983) is an American stand-up comedian, actor, television producer and podcaster. In addition to his stand-up, he is known for his work on MTV2's Guy Code and its two spinoffs, the Flagrant podcast with Akaash Singh, and The Brilliant Idiots podcast. Schulz's first Netflix special, Schulz Saves America, premiered on December 17, 2020. As an actor, he has appeared in IFC's Benders and the Amazon original series Sneaky Pete.

Early life 
Schulz was born on October 30, 1983, in New York City to an immigrant Scottish mother, Sandra Cameron, a professional ballroom dancer, and an American father of German and Irish descent, Larry Schulz. His father is also a native New Yorker and former reporter and military veteran, born to a family from Chicago, Illinois. Schulz's parents owned the Sandra Cameron Dance Center in Lower Manhattan for three decades. He was raised in the East Village in Lower Manhattan and attended New York City Public Schools: Lillie Devereaux Blake Primary School and Robert F. Wagner Middle School in the Upper East Side neighborhood, and Baruch College Campus High School in Kips Bay.

Schulz attended the University of California, Santa Barbara in Santa Barbara, California, from which he graduated with a Bachelor of Arts degree in Psychology.

Career

Stand-up comedy 
Schulz began performing stand-up during college in California and continued when he returned to New York in the mid-2000s. He became a regular at the Comedy Village and went on to make his debut at the Edinburgh Comedy Festival in Edinburgh, Scotland, in 2008.

In September 2017, Schulz self-released his first comedy special, 4:4:1, on YouTube. In June 2018, Schulz followed up with his debut comedy album, 5:5:1 which earned the top ranking on iTunes' comedy album charts. The album went on to rank number one on Apple Music, Google Play, and Amazon;.  The album went number one on the Billboard comedy album charts the week of June 23, 2018. In 2021, Schulz issued a pair of streaming EPs, Views from the Cis and Brilliant Idiot, through 800 Pound Gorilla Records. On July 25, 2022 he released another special on his YouTube channel titled "Infamous"

Television, film, and web series 

Schulz has hosted or appeared on numerous MTV2 shows, including Jobs That Don't Suck, Guy Code, Guy Court, Girl Code and The Hook Up. In 2015, he starred in the IFC series Benders. He also acted in Amazon's Sneaky Pete (2015, 2017), Hulu's There's Johnny! (2017), and HBO's Crashing (2018). Schulz appeared in the feature films The Female Brain (2017), Write When You Get Work (2018), and as himself in No Safe Spaces (2019). His web series credits include writing and starring in Rise of the Radio Show and The Apartmentship.

A four-part Netflix special, Schulz Saves America, premiered on December 17, 2020. The special was accused of being racist by a few sociopolitical commentators for its Anti-Asian jokes blaming Asians for the COVID-19 pandemic. An online petition was created on sign.moveon.org to cancel Schulz's comedy-special.

Podcasts 
Schulz co-hosts two podcasts on Combat Jack's Loud Speakers Network. His best-known podcast is The Brilliant Idiots with fellow MTV2 personality Charlamagne tha God.

Schulz also hosts Flagrant 2 with his best friends and fellow stand-up comedians Akaash Singh and Mark Gagnon, and video editor AlexxMedia. Since starting the podcast, Singh created a Patreon where the hosts post an additional podcast a week.

Personal life 
On December 18, 2021, Schulz married Emma Turner in Montecito, California.

Filmography

Television

Film

Comedy specials

Comedy albums

References

External links
 
 

1983 births
Living people
American people of Scottish descent
American people of German descent
American people of Irish descent
21st-century American comedians
American male comedians
American male film actors
American male television actors
American stand-up comedians
American television personalities
Patreon creators
People from Manhattan
People from New York City
Comedians from New York City
University of California, Santa Barbara alumni